Valeriy Suntsov (born 10 July 1955) is a Russian former racewalking athlete who competed in the 50 kilometres race walk for the Soviet Union. He set his lifetime best of 3:42:37 hours for the event in 1985 in Saint Petersburg (then Leningrad).

He represented his country at the European Athletics Championships on two occasions, winning a bronze medal at the 1986 edition. He competed at the 1987 World Championships in Athletics but was disqualified for lifting. He was a key member of the Soviet team at the IAAF World Race Walking Cup, sharing in the team silver medals in 1981 and 1985 before taking gold at the 1987 IAAF World Race Walking Cup with a team including Vyacheslav Ivanenko, Andrey Perlov and Aleksandr Potashov.

Suntsov was ranked third among Europeans in the 1982 season, behind East German Ronald Weigel and fellow Soviet Viktor Dorovskikh. He was a one-time national champion taking the 50 km walk at the 1986 Soviet Athletics Championships.

International competitions

National titles
Soviet Athletics Championships
50 km walk: 1986

See also
List of European Athletics Championships medalists (men)

References

External links

Living people
1955 births
Soviet male racewalkers
Russian male racewalkers
European Athletics Championships medalists
World Athletics Championships athletes for the Soviet Union